Rotton Park Road railway station was a railway station in England, built by the Harborne Railway and operated by the London and North Western Railway in 1874.

It served Summerfield and part of the Edgbaston area of Birmingham and was located near to the junction of Rotton Park Road and Gillott Road.

Initially single track, the steady growth in traffic meant that a passing loop was installed in 1903, when a spur to Mitchells & Butlers Brewery was also added. However, from the beginning of the 20th century, the introduction of road transport, especially Birmingham Corporation Tramways, caused passenger numbers to fall away.

In 1923, the Harborne Railway, together with its operators the LNWR, became part of the London Midland and Scottish Railway (LMS) at the grouping. The station closed in 1934, and there is little evidence of the station on the ground today. The trackbed through the station is now part of the Harborne Nature Walk.

References

Warwickshire Railways: Rotton Park Road Station

Photos by D J Norton

Disused railway stations in Birmingham, West Midlands
Railway stations in Great Britain opened in 1874
Railway stations in Great Britain closed in 1934
Former London and North Western Railway stations
Edgbaston